María Eugenia Jiménez Valenzuela (born 7 November 1940) is a Mexican politician formerly affiliated with the Party of the Democratic Revolution. As of 2014 she served as Deputy of the LX Legislature of the Mexican Congress representing Nayarit. She also served as Mayor of Tepic from 2001 to 2002.

References

1940 births
Living people
Politicians from Nayarit
Women members of the Chamber of Deputies (Mexico)
Municipal presidents of Tepic
Party of the Democratic Revolution politicians
21st-century Mexican politicians
21st-century Mexican women politicians
Women mayors of places in Mexico
Deputies of the LX Legislature of Mexico
Members of the Chamber of Deputies (Mexico) for Nayarit